The Visit Panamá Cup was a tennis tournament held in Panama City, Panama from 2012 to 2018. The event was part of the ATP Challenger Tour and is played on clay courts.

Past finals

Singles

Doubles

References

External links
Official website

 
ATP Challenger Tour
Tennis tournaments in Panama
Clay court tennis tournaments